Malea pomum, common name the Pacific grinning tun,  is a species of large sea snail, a marine gastropod mollusk in the family Tonnidae, the tun shells.

Description
The size of the shell varies between 40 mm and 90 mm.

The somewhat thick shell is ovate and inflated. It has a whitish ground color, varied and spotted with square spots, of a yellow more or less reddish, alternating upon the transverse ribs, with other spots of a dull white. The short spire is composed of six convex whorls, slightly flattened above, banded with ribs equally convex, wide, not distant, and divided by narrow, shallow furrows. The aperture is somewhat narrow, toothed upon both edges, colored yellow within. The outer lip is dilated, particularly towards the base, and forms externally a very thick convex margin, the external part of which is sharp, undulated, and its internal surface furnished with ten or twelve transverse, distant teeth, resembling folds. The inner lip consists of a smooth plate, convex and white, which partially covers the body of the shell. The columella presents a pretty deep emargination, above which are observed several transverse thick folds, and some others, less numerous, more oblique, and less distinctly marked.

The color of the animal is of a beautiful white, marked upon its circumference with triangular flames of a violet brown. The tentacles are long, slender and pointed, spotted with brown, in the form of triple rings. The trunk is
white, the tube very long, pointed with brown and violet at its extremity.<ref name="Kiener">Kiener (1840). General species and iconography of recent shells : comprising the Massena Museum, the collection of Lamarck, the collection of the Museum of Natural History, and the recent discoveries of travellers; Boston :W.D. Ticknor,1837 (described as  'Dolium pomum)</ref>

Distribution
This marine species occurs in the Red Sea, the tropical Indo-West Pacific, the Philippines; off Tanzania, Madagascar, Mauritius, Mascarenes, Houtman Abrolhos, China; off Australia (the Northern Territory, Queensland and Western Australia).

References

 Linnaeus, C. (1758). Systema Naturae per regna tria naturae, secundum classes, ordines, genera, species, cum characteribus, differentiis, synonymis, locis. Editio decima, reformata. Laurentius Salvius: Holmiae. ii, 824 pp
 Iredale, T. 1931. Australian molluscan notes. No. 1. Records of the Australian Museum 18(4): 201-235, pls xxii-xxv
 Tinker, S. 1949. The Hawaiian Tun Shells. Pacific Science 3(4): 302-306 
 Kilias, R. 1962. Gastropoda/Prosobranchia. Tonnidae. Das Tierreich 77: 1-63
 Wilson, B.R. & Gillett, K. 1971. Australian Shells: illustrating and describing 600 species of marine gastropods found in Australian waters. Sydney : Reed Books 168 pp.
 Kay, E.A. 1979. Hawaiian Marine Shells. Reef and shore fauna of Hawaii. Section 4 : Mollusca. Honolulu, Hawaii : Bishop Museum Press Bernice P. Bishop Museum Special Publication Vol. 64(4) 653 pp.
 Iredale, T. & McMichael, D.F. 1962. A reference list of the marine Mollusca of New South Wales. Memoirs of the Australian Museum 11: 1-109 
 Wilson, B. 1993. Australian Marine Shells. Prosobranch Gastropods''. Kallaroo, Western Australia : Odyssey Publishing Vol. 1 408 pp.

Tonnidae
Gastropods described in 1758
Taxa named by Carl Linnaeus